Cattleya trianae (Lind. & Rchb. fil),  also known as Flor de Mayo ("May flower") or "Christmas orchid", is a plant of the family Orchidaceae. It grows as an epiphytic orchid, with succulent leaves, endemic to Colombia where it was nominated as the national flower in November 1936.  That year, the National Academy of History of Argentina asked the Latin American countries to participate in an exhibition with the representative flowers of each country.  The Colombian government gave the botanist Emilio Robledo the task to designate the most representative flowering plant of the country.

The choice of Cattleya trianae was made for two main reasons:

The lip is yellow, blue and red, in the same way as the Colombian flag.   
The species was named after the 19th century Colombian botanist José Jerónimo Triana.

The species grows at 1500–2000 meters above sea level, in Cloud forests. It is an endangered species due to habitat destruction.

The diploid chromosome number of C. trinae has been determined as 2n = 40. the haploid chromosome number has been determined as n = 20.

References

External links 
 
  tierramerica.net
  Luis Angel Arango Library
  Orquídeas Cattleya

trianae
trianae
Endemic orchids of Colombia
Plants described in 1810
National symbols of Colombia
Epiphytic orchids
Endangered plants